Bahing ancestors named Paiwa, Dungmowa, Rukhusalu, Waripsawa, Timriwa, Dhimriwa, Nayango, Dhayango, Khaliwa/Khaluwa, Rendukpa/Rendu, Rungbu/Rumdali/Diburcha/Thamrocha) is a language spoken by 11,658 people (2011 census) of the Bahing ethnic group in Nepal. It belongs to the family of Kiranti languages, a subgroup of Sino-Tibetan.

The group Rumdali is also known as Nechali among some of them.

Names
Ethnologue lists the following alternate names for Bahing: Baying, Ikke lo, Kiranti-Bahing, Pai Lo, Radu lo. Procha lo

Geographical distribution
Bahing is spoken in the following locations of Nepal (Ethnologue).

Northeastern Okhaldhunga District, Sagarmatha Zone: Harkapur, Ragdip, Bigutar, Baruneswor, Okhaldhunga, Rumjatar, Barnalu, Mamkha, Ratmate, Serna, Diyale, and Bhadaure VDC's (Rumdali dialect)
Mid-southeastern Okhaldhunga District: Ketuke, Moli, Waksa, and Ubu VDC's (Tolocha dialect)
Southern tip of Solukhumbu District: Necha Batase and Salyan VDC's
Khotang District

Dialects
According to Ethnologue, Bahing consists of the Rumdali, Nechali, Tolacha, Moblocha, and Hangu dialects, with 85% or above intelligibility among all dialects. Bahing is best understood by the most people.

Documentation
The Bahing language was described by Brian Houghton Hodgson (1857, 1858) as having a very complex verbal morphology. By the 1970s, only vestiges were left, making Bahing a case study of grammatical attrition and language death.

Phonology
Bahing and the related Khaling language have synchronic ten-vowel systems. The difference of  "monkey" vs.  "human being" is difficult to perceive for speakers of even neighboring dialects, which makes for "an unlimited source of fun to the Bahing people" (de Boer 2002 PDF).

Morphology
Hodgson (1857) reported a middle voice formed by a suffix -s(i) added  to the verbal stem, corresponding to reflexives in other Kiranti languages.

References

External links
Himalayan Languages Project

Kiranti languages
Languages of Nepal
Languages of India
Languages of Koshi Province